Davide Ramponi (born 10 January 1997) is an Italian footballer who plays for ASD RG Ticino.

Honours

Club 
 Monza
Serie D: 2016-17

References

Italian footballers
Association football fullbacks
People from Verbania
1997 births
Living people
Novara F.C. players
A.C. Monza players
U.S. Folgore Caratese A.S.D. players
F.C. Pavia players
S.S. Verbania Calcio players
Serie D players
Footballers from Piedmont
Sportspeople from the Province of Verbano-Cusio-Ossola